Grounded is a coming-of-age story by Mark Sable and Paul Azaceta about a boy without super-powers who is sent to a high-school for super-powered teens. It was originally published as a six-issue limited series by Image Comics and was later collected in a trade paperback edition.

External links

Interviews
Comicon.com interview with Mark Sable and Paul Azaceta
Silver Bullet Comics interview

2005 comics debuts